Sri Penusila Narasimha Wildlife Sanctuary is a famous 1030.85 km² Protected area in Nellore District of Andhra Pradesh state in South India. It comprises a unique and endangered forest type viz.

Geography
Sri Penusila Narasimha Wildlife Sanctuary is located in Nellore District of Andhra Pradesh. It covers an area of 1030.85 km² is managed by the Andhra Pradesh Forest Department 
Comprises a unique and endangered forest type viz. the dry evergreen forests. The wildlife sanctuary is characterized by hilly slopes, rolling forested hills, and low valleys.

Flora
Dry evergreen forest type with species like Accacias, Cassias, Pongamia, Carissa are found in the sanctuary.

Fauna
Panther, Cheetal, Nilgai, Chowsingha, Sloth Bear, Jackal, Wild Boar, and large numbers of reptile and bird species are found in the wildlife sanctuary.

References

Bird sanctuaries of Andhra Pradesh
Protected areas with year of establishment missing